Hiroki Morinoue (born 1947, ヒロキ モリノーエ) is an American artist of Japanese descent who has helped to pioneer in the United States the fusion of western Impressionism with modern Japanese design.

Early life
Morinoue was born in Kealakekua and raised near Holualoa, formerly a major coffee plantation town in the mountains above Kailua-Kona on the Big Island of Hawaii.  Japanese workers were imported from Japan at the turn of the 20th century to Hawaii to work the plantations.  Although the coffee plantations are gone, Holualoa remains a major producer and exporter of Kona coffee from a cooperative of private growers. In addition, a large artist colony has taken hold in the town itself.

Education
Morinoue studied at the California College of Arts and Crafts in Oakland, California, where he received his BFA degree. Later, while in Japan, Morinoue studied with a master sumi-e artist and a master of woodblock printing.  Morinoue still makes his home in Holualoa, on the Big Island of Hawaii.

Works
It was Morinoue's seemingly abstract paintings of calm water on textured wood or woodblock prints that propelled him to prominence. The play of light on pebbles at the bottom of a creek or pond, bubbles, ripples, or the reflection on the surface of water are combined with a Japanese sense of balance and design in intense shades of aqua, black and blue creating art of refined, serene elegance. Subsequent works show a trend towards abstract art, experimentation in warmer palettes, rougher strokes, various subject matters and media such as ceramics and photography.

Hiroki Morinoue can be seen in several public and private collections in the USA (particularly in Hawaii) and Japan.

Selected Collections
 The Hawaii State Library
 The Hawaii Convention Center, Honolulu, HI
 The Hawaii State Foundation on Culture and the Arts
 Honolulu Council on Culture and the Arts, HI
 The Honolulu Museum of Art, HI
 The Honolulu Museum of Art Spalding House, HI
 The Achenbach Foundation for Graphic Arts, San Francisco, CA
 The National Park Collection, MD
 Ueno no Mori Museum, Tokyo, Japan
 City of Fujisawa, Kanagawa, Japan
 The Boulder Museum of Contemporary Art, Colorado
 Ross Art Collection, University of Michigan, Ann Arbor, MI

References
 Clarke, Joan and Diane Dods, Artists/Hawaii, Honolulu, University of Hawaii Press, 1996, 44-49.
 Morse, Morse (ed.), Honolulu Printmakers, Honolulu, HI, Honolulu Academy of Arts, 2003, pp. 66 & 87, 
 Yoshihara, Lisa A., Collective Visions, 1967-1997, An Exhibition Celebrating the 30th Anniversary of the State Foundation on Culture and the Arts, Art in Public Places Program, Presented at the Honolulu Academy of Arts, September 3-October 12, 1997, Honolulu, State Foundation on Culture and the Arts, 1997, p. 56.

External links
 Hiroki Morinoue's Commercial Biography at Sharks Ink
 Hiroki Morinoue at 15th Street Gallery
 Hiroki Morinoue at Freed Gallery
 Hiroki Morinoue at William Zimmer Gallery

20th-century American painters
American male painters
21st-century American painters
1947 births
Living people
Artists from Hawaii
American artists of Japanese descent
People from Hawaii (island)
20th-century American male artists